Seko Padang is an Austronesian language spoken in the North Luwu Regency of South Sulawesi, Indonesia. Together with Seko Tengah, Panasuan and Budong-Budong, it belongs to the Seko branch of the South Sulawesi subgroup.

References

Languages of Sulawesi
South Sulawesi languages